The 2013 Bojangles' Southern 500, the 64th running of the event, was a NASCAR Sprint Cup Series stock car race held on May 11, 2013, at Darlington Raceway in Darlington, South Carolina, United States. The race was contested over 367 laps on the 1.366–mile (2.198 km) oval, it was the eleventh race of the 2013 Sprint Cup Series championship. Matt Kenseth of Joe Gibbs Racing won the race, his third win of the 2013 season, while his teammate Denny Hamlin finished second. Jeff Gordon grabbed his 300th top 5 finish in his 700th Sprint Cup start, while Jimmie Johnson and Kevin Harvick rounded out the top five.

There were five cautions for 25 laps and nine lead changes between four different drivers throughout the course of the race. The result moved Kenseth to the third position in the Drivers' Championship, 59 points behind Jimmie Johnson in first and five ahead of Dale Earnhardt Jr. in fourth. Chevrolet maintained its lead in the Manufacturers' Championship, two points ahead of Toyota and 18 ahead of Ford, with 25 races remaining in the season.

Report

Background

Darlington Raceway is a four-turn  oval. The track's first two turns are banked at twenty-five degrees, while the final two turns are banked two degrees lower at twenty-three degrees. The front stretch (the location of the finish line) and the back stretch is banked at six degrees. Darlington Raceway can seat up to 60,000 people. Jimmie Johnson was the defending race winner after winning the event during the 2012 race.

Before the race, Johnson was leading the Drivers' Championship with 383 points, while Carl Edwards stood in second with 342 points. Dale Earnhardt Jr. followed in the third with 324, seven ahead of Matt Kenseth in fourth, and eight ahead of Clint Bowyer in fifth. Brad Keselowski, with 314, was in sixth; fifteen points ahead of Kasey Kahne. Eighth-placed Aric Almirola was three points ahead of Paul Menard and eight ahead of Kyle Busch in ninth and tenth. Greg Biffle was eleventh with 280, while Kevin Harvick completed the first twelve positions with 279 points.  In the Manufacturers' Championship, Chevrolet was leading with 68 points, five points ahead of Toyota. Ford was third after recording only 52 points during the first ten races.

Practice and qualifying

Two practice sessions were held in preparation for the race; both on Friday, May 10, 2013. The first session lasted for 120 minutes, while second session was 45 minutes long.  During the first practice session, Menard, for the Richard Childress Racing team, was quickest ahead of Bowyer in second and McMurray in third. Earnhardt Jr. was scored fourth, and Edwards managed fifth. Kyle Busch, Martin Truex Jr., Juan Pablo Montoya, Kenseth, and Biffle rounded out the top ten quickest drivers in the session.

Montoya was quickest in the second and final practice session, ahead of Ricky Stenhouse Jr. in second and Edwards in third. Jeff Burton was fourth quickest, and Kurt Busch took fifth. Biffle, Kenseth, Jeff Gordon, Truex Jr., and Kyle Busch followed in the top ten.

During qualifying, forty-three cars were entered. Kurt Busch clinched his first pole position of the season, with a record time of 27.032 seconds. After his qualifying run, Kurt Busch commented, "Wow, what an incredible lap. The way the team gave me the confidence right when we first unloaded, the team deserves all the credit. This gives me a great shot to stay ahead of the field and win by two-thousandths of a second this time."  He was joined on the front row of the grid by Johnson. Kyle Busch qualified third, Kahne took fourth, and Truex Jr. started fifth. Denny Hamlin, Kenseth, Gordon, Biffle, and Harvick completed the first ten positions on the grid.

Race

Results

Qualifying

Race results

Standings after the race

Drivers' Championship standings

Manufacturers' Championship standings

Note: Only the first twelve positions are included for the driver standings.

References

Bojangles' Southern 500
Bojangles' Southern 500
Bojangles' Southern 500
NASCAR races at Darlington Raceway